Joseph Paul Benoit Lévis Brien (born March 21, 1955) is a Quebec politician. He served as the member for Dubuc in the Quebec National Assembly as a member of the Parti Québécois from 1989 until 1998.

Biography

Brien earned his bachelor's degree in Consumer Applied Science from Université Laval in 1978.

He worked as an information officer at Cooprix Lanaudière, Joliette, and the Local Consumer Information Center, Saint-Félix-de-Valois, from 1978 to 1984. He was a public relations officer at Statistics Canada from 1984 to 1989.

He was appointed commissioner for the Quebec Agricultural Markets and Foods Authority on February 5, 1999 and worked as a professor of English at the Commission scolaire des Samares and the Commission scolaire des Affluents.

Political career

Brien was a municipal councilor from 1987 to 1989 for Saint-Gérard-Majella. He worked in the office of Joliette MP René Laurin before he ran in Rousseau in 1994 as the Parti Québécois formed the government.

He was a backbench supporter in the Bouchard government.

Brien did not seek re-election in 1998. He ran for the Liberal Party of Canada in Repentigny in 2004 and lost.

Electoral record

Federal

Provincial

References 

1955 births
Living people
Canadian public relations people
French Quebecers
Candidates in the 2004 Canadian federal election
Parti Québécois MNAs
People from Joliette
Quebec candidates for Member of Parliament
Quebec municipal councillors
Université Laval
20th-century Canadian legislators
Liberal Party of Canada candidates for the Canadian House of Commons